Zanthoxylum oahuense, commonly known as ae or Oahu prickly-ash, is a species of flowering plant in the family Rutaceae, that is endemic to the island of Oahu in Hawaii. It is threatened by habitat loss.

References

oahuense
Endemic flora of Hawaii
Biota of Oahu
Trees of Hawaii
Taxonomy articles created by Polbot